Delis Matías Vargas Blanco (born 25 October 1994) is a Uruguayan footballer who plays as a forward for Albion.

References

External links

1994 births
Living people
Uruguayan footballers
Uruguayan expatriate footballers
Association football forwards
Tacuarembó F.C. players
Juventud de Las Piedras players
C.A. Cerro players
Rampla Juniors players
Real C.D. España players
Albion F.C. players
Uruguayan Primera División players
Uruguayan expatriate sportspeople in Honduras
Expatriate footballers in Honduras